Agonum duftschmidi is a species of beetle from family Carabidae, found in all European countries except for Andorra, Iceland, Malta, Monaco, Portugal, and Vatican City.

References

Beetles described in 1994
duftschmidi
Beetles of Europe